Lavrenti Lopes is an Indian actor and model.

Filmography

References
Hindu NXG
Theater Online
Verve
Financial Express

Year of birth missing (living people)
Living people
Indian male film actors
Indian male models